The Kadambas of Hangal was a South Indian dynasty during the Late Classical period on the Indian subcontinent, which originated in the region of Hangal in Karnataka. Chatta Deva who reigned from 980–1031 CE founded the dynasty. He helped Western Chalukyas in the coup against the Rashtrakutas; re-established the Kadamba Dynasty mostly as a feudatory of Western Chalukyas, but his successors enjoyed considerable independence and were almost sovereign rulers of Goa and Konkan till 14th century CE.

The successors of Chatta Deva occupied both Banavasi and Hangal and are known as Kadambas of Hangal. Uniting Banavasi and Hangal, distinguished himself against the Cholas and carved out a kingdom (which stretched, on this side, including Ratnagiri district, up to Kolhapur). He is referred to as having conquered Konkan. When the Chalukyas under their king, Jayasimha II made an advance on Dhar (capital of the Malavas) and defeated Bhoja, who was then the Paramara king, the part played by Chaltadev (Chatta Deva), the feudatory of the Chalukyas, was significant. During 1075-1116 Kirtivarma subdued the 7 Konkans.

According to historian, George M. Moraes, Due to the struggle between the Hoysalas and the Yadavas, for supremacy, the Kadambas of Hangal under Kamdeva marched against the Konkan and compelled Vijayadatta (to transfer his allegiance to him). But during 1187 and 1188, immediately on his accession, Jayakesi III declared himself independent. Later Kadambas kept paying nominal allegiance to Yadavas and Hoysalas of Dorasamudra and thus maintained their independence.

Different families of Kadambas ruled southern India, notable were Kadambas of Hangal, Kadambas of Goa, Kadambas of Halasi and Kadambas of Banavasi.

Minor Kadamba Kingdoms

The Kadambas of Banavasi declined by sixth century, by the tenth century Kadamba were local chiefs, the Kadamba of Hangal emerged as a vassal of the Western Chalukyas, and the Kadambas of Goa at Goa and Konkan until the fourteenth century. Similarly some more minor Kadamba branches established, they remained vassals.

Kadambas of Bankapur
They served as regional governors for  Kadambas of Banavasi and then Kadambas of Hangal.

Kadambas of Bayalnad
After the fall of the Western Gangas, the Kadambas of Bayalnad established as independent kingdom. It was founded by Kaviyammarasa, who ruled towards end of 10th century CE.

Kadambas of Nagarkhanda
Kadambas of Nagarkhanda descendants of Mayuravarma of Hangal, served as regional governors, Nagarkhanda is the district to the north-east of Banavasi. They titled as boon lords of Banavasipura, their capital was at Bandhavapura. Initially the Kadambas of Hangal refused to acknowledge suzerainty of Kalachuris of Kalyani, that led to war between them, then Kalachuris helped Somadeva as per the 1159 inscription Somadeva subordinate of Kalachuris, they conquered Banavasi and handed it over to Somadeva (in 1165).

Kadambas of Uchchangi
The Kadambas of Uchchangi were in name only kings of Banavasi actually the power remain with Kadambas of Hangal.

Coinage of Hangal Kadambas

Kadambas coins were among the heaviest and perhaps purest of all medieval Indian gold coinage. Kadambas issued 2 types of gold coins, namely Punch-marked gold coins and Die struck gold coins. During 1075-1094 CE, Shanti Varma, issued gold punch marked coin
and in 1065 CE, Toyimadeva, issued die struck gold coins (Pagoda).

Punch-marked gold coins
 Kadamba punch-marked gold coin issued in name of Jaysimha II Jagadekamalla (Chalukya).
 Coin consists of a central punch mark of Hanuman, and 4 retrospectant lions.
 2 prominent punch marks create 2 Shri alphabets depicts goddess Laxmi in Telugu-Kannada script.

Die struck gold coins (Pagoda)

 In 1065 AD Kadambas Toyimadeva issued first die struck gold coins.
 The gold coin of Kadambas depict god Hanuman, inside lined circle and dotted circle, flanked by two chouries and conch. Also include the figures of sun and moon. Below is the legend Nakara (Nagara, the deity of Bankapura, Nagareshwara) in Telugu-Kannada script.

See also

 Kadamba dynasty
 Kadambas of Goa
 Kadamba architecture
 Hangal
 Halasi
 Banavasi
 Vajjada II
 Indian coinage
 Kadambas of Bayalnadu (Vainadu)

References

History of Karnataka
Empires and kingdoms of India
Kadambas
Dynasties of India
Former countries in South Asia
10th century in India
11th century in India
Ancient currencies